Konar Tanku (also Romanized as Konār Tankū; also known as Qanāt Tangū (Persian: قنات تنگو) and Konār Tangū-e Vasaţ) is a village in Dezhgan Rural District, in the Central District of Bandar Lengeh County, Hormozgan Province, Iran. At the 2006 census, its population was 27, in 6 families.

References 

Populated places in Bandar Lengeh County